Paul Anthony Cartledge (born 24 March 1947) is a British ancient historian and academic. From 2008 to 2014 he was the A. G. Leventis Professor of Greek Culture at the University of Cambridge. He had previously held a personal chair in Greek History at Cambridge.

Early life
Cartledge was educated at St Paul's School and New College, Oxford, where, with his contemporaries Robin Lane Fox and Terence Irwin, he was a student of G. E. M. de Ste. Croix. He graduated with a Bachelor of Arts degree, later promoted to MA (Oxon) by seniority, in 1969. He remained at the University of Oxford to undertake postgraduate studies, completing a Doctor of Philosophy (DPhil) under the supervision of Professor Sir John Boardman. His thesis focused on Spartan archaeology.

Academic career
Cartledge lectured at the New University of Ulster in 1972–73, at Trinity College, Dublin, from 1973 to 1978, and at the University of Warwick in 1978–79. In October 1979 he moved to Cambridge University where he is a fellow of Clare College.

In 2008, Cartledge was elected to the newly established A. G. Leventis Professorship of Greek Culture at Cambridge University, a position from which he retired at the end of September 2014.

Cartledge holds a visiting Global Distinguished Professorship at New York University, funded by the Greek Parliament, and sits on the European Advisory Board of Princeton University Press.

Cartledge is also a holder of the Gold Cross of the Order of Honour of Greece and an Honorary Citizen of (modern) Sparta.

Field of study
Cartledge's field of study is Athens and Sparta in the Classical Age; he has been described as a Laconophile.

He was chief historical consultant for the BBC TV series The Greeks and the Channel 4 series The Spartans, presented by Bettany Hughes.

Personal life
Cartledge is married to Judith Portrait, a solicitor who acts as trustee of part of the Sainsbury family shareholding in Sainsbury's in blind trust.

In August 2014, Cartledge was one of 200 public figures who were signatories to a letter to The Guardian opposing Scottish independence in the run-up to September's referendum on that issue.

Publications
 Aristophanes and His Theatre of the Absurd (1989), Duckworth. 
 Nomos : Essays in Athenian Law, Politics and Society (1991), Cambridge University Press. 
 Spartan Reflections, a collection of essays new and revised (Duckworth, 2001), 
 Sparta and Lakonia (2nd edn. 2002).
 Hellenistic and Roman Sparta (rev. edns 2002), (with A. Spawforth).
 The Greeks: A Portrait of Self and Others (2nd edn, 2002), the product of research into Greek self-definition.
 Kosmos: essays in Order, Conflict and Community in Classical Athens  (coauthor Paul Millett; (2002), Cambridge University Press. 
 The Spartans: An Epic History (2nd edn, 2003).
 Alexander the Great: The Hunt for a New Past (2004).
 Helots and Their Masters in Laconia and Messenia: Histories, Ideologies, Structures (2004), Center for Hellenic Studies. 
 Thermopylae: The Battle That Changed the World (2006), The Overlook Press. 
 Ancient Greek Political Thought in Practice (2009), Cambridge University Press. 
 Ancient Greece: A History in Eleven Cities, (2009), Oxford University Press. 
 Democracy: A Life (2016), Oxford University Press. 
 Thebes: The Forgotten City of Ancient Greece (2020), Picador.

References

External links 
  Interview with Paul Cartledge.
 'Forever Young: why Cambridge has a Professorship of Greek Culture'  An inaugural lecture by Professor Paul Cartledge to mark the establishment of the A G Leventis Professorship of Greek Culture, Monday 16 February 2009 at Mill Lane Lecture Theatre, Cambridge
 The myths of 'ancient Greece' dispelled, as explained by Paul Cartledge
 
 Forward To The Past! Hello To Democracy, Sparta, And All That  A valedictory lecture by The AG Leventis Professor Of Greek Culture, Professor Paul Cartledge, Thursday 20 February 2014 at Mill Lane Lecture Theatre, Cambridge

1947 births
People educated at St Paul's School, London
Alumni of New College, Oxford
Fellows of Clare College, Cambridge
Scholars of ancient Greek history
English historians
Living people
Academics of Ulster University
Classical scholars of Trinity College Dublin
Academics of the University of Warwick
Gold Crosses of the Order of Honour (Greece)
Members of the University of Cambridge faculty of classics
English male non-fiction writers
English classical scholars
Professors of the University of Cambridge
Contributors to the Oxford Classical Dictionary